Wilmore Heights is a populated place in Cambria County, Pennsylvania.

See also
Wilmore Coal Company

References

Unincorporated communities in Pennsylvania